Villa Crespo y San Andrés is a small town or populated centre in the Canelones Department of southern Uruguay. Together with its neighbouring Toledo, they form a population centre of about 13,800. They are both part of the wider metropitan area of Montevideo.

Geography
The town is located on Km. 22 of Route 6 and on Route 33, bordering Toledo to the east.

Population
In 2011 Villa Crespo y San Andrés had a population of 9,813.
 
Source: Instituto Nacional de Estadística de Uruguay

References

External links
INE map of Villa Crespo y San Andrés, Toledo, Fracc.Camino del Andaluz y R.84, Joaquín Suárez, Fracc.sobre Ruta 74, Villa San José, Villa San Felipe, Villa Hadita, Seis Hermanos and Villa Porvenir

Populated places in the Canelones Department